Andrija i Anđelka (English title: Andrija and Anđelka) is a Serbian comedy series that was broadcast on Prva Srpska Televizija between October 5, 2015, and June 13, 2016. It is based on the Quebec comedy television series Un gars, une fille.

2015 Serbian television series debuts
Television shows set in Belgrade
2016 Serbian television series endings
Television shows filmed in Belgrade
Prva Srpska Televizija original programming